is one of 24 wards of Osaka, Japan. It has an area of 7.9 km², and a population of 84,961. Literally translated, Minato-ku means "Harbor Ward".

Landmarks 
Kaiyukan (Osaka Aquarium)
Port of Osaka
Tempozan Harbor Village
Modern Transportation Museum
ORC 200

Mass media
Radio Osaka (ORC 200 Building, Benten)

Train stations 
West Japan Railway Company (JR West)
Osaka Loop Line
Bentencho Station
Osaka Metro
Chūō Line
Osakako Station - Asashiobashi Station - Bentencho Station

Notable people from Minato-ku, Osaka 
Hideo Nomo, Japanese former baseball pitcher
Kaori Kozai, Japanese enka singer
Machiko Kyō, Japanese actress
Ryōma Nishikawa, Japanese baseball player
Tadao Ando, Japanese architect, Pritzker Prize winner

External links

Official website of Minato 

Wards of Osaka